Stratiomys potamida, the banded general, is a European species of soldier fly.

References

Stratiomyidae
Diptera of Europe
Insects described in 1822
Taxa named by Johann Wilhelm Meigen